Al-Assad Stadium is a multi-purpose stadium in Latakia, Syria. It is currently used mostly for football matches. The stadium has a capacity of 28,000 spectators. The stadium was opened in 1978 and completely renovated in 2004. It is home to Syrian Premier League football clubs Hutteen SC and Tishreen SC.

The complex includes a nearby Olympic size swimming and diving pools and a hotel.

The stadium was home to the final match of the football competition at the 1987 Mediterranean Games.

References

Football venues in Syria
Buildings and structures in Latakia
Multi-purpose stadiums in Syria
Sport in Latakia
Sports venues completed in 1978
1978 establishments in Syria